Einstein and Eddington is a British single drama produced by Company Pictures and the BBC, in association with HBO. It featured David Tennant as British scientist Sir Arthur Stanley Eddington, and Andy Serkis as Albert Einstein. This is the story of Einstein's general theory of relativity, his relationship with Eddington and the introduction of this theory to the world, against the backdrop of the Great War and Eddington's eclipse observations.

It was first broadcast on BBC Two on 22 November 2008.

Plot
The prelude is set in 1919 on Eddington's expedition in Príncipe to observe the solar eclipse that year, before moving back in time to 1914. At the outbreak of the First World War, Eddington is appointed chief astronomer at Cambridge by Sir Oliver Lodge and instructed to research Einstein's work and defend the Newtonian status quo. Meanwhile, Einstein is lured back from Zürich to the Prussian Academy of Sciences in Berlin in an attempt to aid the war effort by embarrassing Britain by disproving the work of its great scientist Isaac Newton. In Berlin, with his marriage already under tension, Einstein falls in love with his cousin Elsa.

A Quaker and therefore unable to go to war, Eddington sets out to bid farewell to his love interest William Marston, as the latter goes off to war as an officer, but just misses Marston's train. He then presents his lecture to his fellow astronomers at the university—defending Newton, but still thinking Einstein might be right—and takes the German Müller family into his home after saving them from a violent anti-German mob. When Einstein's wife arrives in Berlin, she discovers Einstein's affair and leaves him, whilst Eddington faces down protesters who despise his status as a conscientious objector. Einstein arrives late at a demonstration of Fritz Haber's poison gas and is so disgusted by this application of science to murder that he rejects an offer to convert his citizenship back from Swiss to German and refuses to sign the "Manifesto to the Civilized World", a list of prominent German scientists, artists and academics supporting the war.

Eddington finds his research into Einstein's work obstructed by a British ban on the circulation of German scientific literature. Realising that Mercury's orbit is precessing slightly less than it should be according to Newton's laws, he writes to Einstein despite the ban to inquire into his view on the problem. Einstein's relationship with Elsa deepens, and on receiving Eddington's letter he starts work on this new avenue with Max Planck, whilst consoling colleague Planck on the loss of his son in the war despite Einstein's lack of belief in a human-like God or an afterlife. They find that Einstein's work agrees with Mercury's orbit where Newton's does not, and send this reply back to Eddington.

At the same time, Eddington grieves over Marston, among the 15,000 killed by German use of chlorine gas at the Second Battle of Ypres, causing doubts in his faith, but leading him to fight all the more loudly against an expulsion of German scientists from the Royal Society. The expulsion has been initiated by Lodge, whose son was also among the killed and who clings to Newton as a consolation of "order in the universe", but Eddington is unable to admit to Lodge that he too is grieving for a loved one.

News of the gas attack also leads Einstein to an outburst against his fellow scientists, which leads to his being cut off from the university, and—overworking—he falls sick and Elsa leaves him. Even so, he manages to complete his work on general relativity and on how starlight bends and gets this result through to Eddington via Planck. Eddington realises he can prove that space and light are being bent by observing the solar eclipse of 29 May 1919 on the west African island of Príncipe, and with Dyson as an ally, manages to gain funding for his expedition, despite Lodge's initial opposition. As the war ends, Eddington's sister and housekeeper, Winifred, sets off to help the Quaker relief effort in war-shattered Germany despite her fears as to Eddington's waning faith.

The action returns to the Príncipe expedition, delayed by bad weather until the last moment, while Einstein briefly returns to his ex-wife and children. Bringing back two photographs from the eclipse to compare to photographs of the night sky in normal conditions, Eddington compares them in public, with Lodge and Winifred in attendance, and not only proves Einstein right but also finds this confirmation reaffirming his faith—as he states, "I can hear God, thinking". News of his vindication reaches Einstein, and crowds of press arrive at his door just as Elsa returns to him.  A year later, in the closing scene, Einstein visits Cambridge and meets Eddington. The closing credits remark on both scientists' later work, Einstein's celebrity and Eddington's obscurity.

Cast

Germany
 Andy Serkis as Albert Einstein
 Lucy Cohu as Mileva Einstein
 Jodhi May as Elsa Einstein
 Donald Sumpter as Max Planck
 Callum Williams as Hans Einstein
 Jacob Théato as Eduard Einstein
 Anton Lesser as Fritz Haber
 John Bowe as Leopold Koppel
 Kika Markham as Aunt Fanny
 Philip Whitchurch as Uncle Rudolf

Britain
 David Tennant as Arthur Eddington
 Jim Broadbent as Sir Oliver Lodge
 Rebecca Hall as Winnifred Eddington, Arthur's Sister
 Richard McCabe as Frank Watson Dyson
 Lucy Briers as The Librarian
 Paul Brooke as H.H. Turner
 Oliver Hall as Boy Throwing Stones
 Patrick Kennedy as William Marston
 Christopher Campbell as Herr Muller
 Caroline Gruber as Frau Muller
 Eleanor Tomlinson as Agnes Muller
 Ben Uttley as First Tennis Player
 Richard Graham as Man With White Feather

Production

Einstein And Eddington is written by Peter Moffat and directed by Philip Martin, who both collaborated for the production of Hawking, a BBC biopic about the physicist. It is produced by Company Pictures and the BBC, with HBO and Pioneer Pictures, Hungary.

Location filming occurred at the Hungarian Academy of Sciences, St John's College, Cambridge, and on the Adriatic Coast of Croatia. Walter Isaacson acted as consultant (with Francisco Diego as eclipse advisor).

References

External links 
 
 Einstein and Eddington – BBC Two
 Einstein and Eddington – HBO

2008 television films
2008 films
British television films
Television series by All3Media
Films scored by Nicholas Hooper
Works about Albert Einstein
Cultural depictions of Albert Einstein
Films about Quakers
World War I films based on actual events
World War I television films
Films set on the United Kingdom home front during World War I
Films shot in Cambridgeshire
Films directed by Philip Martin (director)